Slightly French is a 1949 American musical comedy film directed by Douglas Sirk and starring Dorothy Lamour, Don Ameche and Janis Carter. The screenplay concerns a Hollywood director who recruits an American singer.

Plot
After clashing with the French star of his film who then quits, a Hollywood director recruits an American singer whom he tries to pass off as a Frenchwoman.

Cast
 Dorothy Lamour as Mary O'Leary aka Rochelle Olivia  
 Don Ameche as John Gayle  
 Janis Carter as Louisa Gayle  
 Willard Parker as Douglas Hyde  
 Adele Jergens as Yvonne La Tour  
 Jeanne Manet as Nicolette

References

Bibliography
 Stern, Michael. Douglas Sirk. Twayne Publishers, 1979.

External links
 

1949 films
1949 musical comedy films
American black-and-white films
American musical comedy films
Columbia Pictures films
Films about Hollywood, Los Angeles
Films scored by George Duning
Films directed by Douglas Sirk
1940s English-language films
1940s American films